The December 1949 Singapore Municipal Commission election took place on 3 December 1949 to elect 6 of the 18 seats in the Singapore Municipal Commission.

Results

By constituency

References

1949 12
1949 in Singapore
Singapore
December 1949 events in Asia